Caryocolum inflativorella is a moth of the family Gelechiidae. It is found in Slovakia, Hungary, Romania and North Macedonia.

The length of the forewings is 5.5–8 mm for males and 6–7 mm for females. The forewings are mottled dark brown with light yellowish brown markings. Adults have been recorded on wing from late June to mid-August.

The larvae feed on Silene vulgaris. They feed in the stem of the host plant, causing an internodial gall. Pupation also takes place within the stem. Larvae can be found in June.

References

Moths described in 1938
inflativorella
Moths of Europe